The 1974–75 WHA season was the third season of the World Hockey Association. Fourteen teams each played 78 games. The Houston Aeros won the Avco World Trophy for the second straight year in dominating fashion, losing only one time in the playoffs.

Regular season
The WHA expanded by adding the Indianapolis Racers and Phoenix Roadrunners, and splitting into three divisions: Western, Eastern, and Canadian. The top two teams in each division qualified for the playoffs along with the two next best teams overall. Prior to the season, Southern California welcomed the Jersey Knights, who moved to San Diego and became the Mariners, and said goodbye to the Los Angeles Sharks, who moved to Detroit and became the Michigan Stags. Midway through the season, the Stags moved to Baltimore and became the Blades; they folded for good after the season. Chicago also folded at season's end. Also, the New England Whalers left Boston for Hartford, but played the first half of the season in Springfield, Massachusetts until construction on the Hartford Civic Center was finished.

The NHL also expanded this season, to 18 teams, making a total of 32 clubs playing major professional hockey in North America. This number has not been surpassed, though the NHL expanded to 32 teams in 2021.

Final standings

Player stats

Scoring leaders
Bolded numbers indicate season leaders

GP = Games played; G = Goals; A = Assists; Pts = Points; PIM = Penalty minutes

Leading goaltenders 
Bolded numbers indicate season leaders

GP = Games played; Min = Minutes played; W = Wins; L = Losses; T = Ties, GA = Goals against; GA = Goals against; SO = Shutouts; SV% = Save percentage; GAA = Goals against average

All-Star game
At Northlands Coliseum in Edmonton, the West defeated the East 6-4.

Avco World Trophy playoffs
Eight teams qualified for the playoffs; the top two teams in each division and the next two teams with the highest point totals.  The teams were then pooled together, according to point totals, to determine quarter-final match-ups.  The three division winners were guaranteed the top three seeds, according to their point totals. Teams were not "reseeded" after the quarter-final round.

WHA awards

Trophies

All-Star Team

See also
1974 Summit Series
1974 WHA Amateur Draft
1974 in sports
1975 in sports

References

 
2
2
World Hockey Association seasons